The Ostrow Textile Company was founded in 1912 in New York City. It moved to Charlotte, North Carolina in 1963, and to Rock Hill, South Carolina in 1968. It finally went bankrupt in 2005. The company operated Plej's textile mill outlets and was a distributor of linens and domestics.

See also 
 Rock Hill Cotton Factory: An Ostrow Textile Mill

References 

Clothing companies of the United States
Defunct manufacturing companies based in South Carolina
Clothing companies established in 1912
Retail companies established in 1912
1912 establishments in New York (state)
2005 disestablishments in South Carolina